Fielding Dawson (August 2, 1930 – January 5, 2002, aged 71) was a Beat-era author of short stories and novels, and a student at Black Mountain College. He was also a painter and collagist whose works were seen in several books of poetry and many literary magazines.

Born in New York City, Dawson was known for his stream-of-consciousness style.  Much of his work was lax in punctuation to emphasize the immediacy of thought.  Additionally, dialogue would often be used to break this up.  His lack of deference toward tradition in writing, other than that of the necessity to evoke humanity, often painfully raw, is what puts him in the category of many of his better-known contemporaries, such as Jack Kerouac or Allen Ginsberg.

Dawson was still writing up until his unexpected death in January 2002. He had become a teacher, first in prisons like Sing Sing, at the Jack Kerouac School of Disembodied Poetics at the Naropa Institute in Boulder, where he taught regularly, and continuing on to work with at-risk students at Upward Bound High School in Hartwick, New York.

He was recently called "The Best St. Louis Writer You've Never Read" by David Clewell, a professor of history at Webster University.

Partial bibliography
Elizabeth Constantine, Biltmore Press (1955)
An Emotional Memoir of Franz Kline, Pantheon Books (1967)
Krazy Kat/The Unveiling and Other Stories from 1951-1968, Black Sparrow Press (1969)
The Black Mountain Book, E.P. Dutton (1970)
Open Road: A Novel, Black Sparrow Press (1970)
The Mandalay Dream, Bobbs-Merrill (1971)
The Dream/Thunder Road, Stories and Dreams 1955-1965, Black Sparrow Press (1972)
The Greatest Story Ever Told: A Transformation, Black Sparrow Press (1973)
A Great Day for a Ballgame, Bobbs-Merrill (1973)
"Penny Lane" Black Sparrow Press (1977)
"Two Penny Lane" Black Sparrow Press (1977)
"Three Penny Lane" Black Sparrow Press (1981)
"Krazy Kat And 76 More" Black Sparrow Press (1982)
"Tiger Lilies-an American childhood" Duke University Press (1984)
"The Black Mountain Book: Expanded and revised edition" North Carolina Wesleyan College Press (1991)
"Introduction" Charles Olson in Connecticut, Charles Boer, North Carolina Wesleyan College Press (1991)
"The Orange in the Orange" Black Sparrow Press (1995)
"Three Penny Lane" Black Sparrow Press
"The Trick: New Stories" Black Sparrow Press (1990)
"Virginia Dare, Stories 1976-1981" Black Sparrow Press
"Will She Understand?" Black Sparrow Press
"The Land of Milk & Honey" XOXOXpress (2001)
"The Dirty Blue Car" XOXOXpress (2004)

Sources
Guardian Books Obituary

Fielding Dawson's bio and books at xoxoxpress.com

Dawson: The Best St. Louis Writer You've Never Read

20th-century American novelists
1930 births
2002 deaths
Black Mountain College alumni
American male novelists
American male short story writers
20th-century American short story writers
20th-century American male writers